Olga Sawicka (7 February 1932, in Poznań – 2 April 2015) was a Polish dancer and choreographer. She was the prima ballerina of the Opera St Moniuszko, Poznań (1963–74). She was director of the ballet at the Music Theatre in Poznań (1974–76).

Sawicka died in Skolimów-Konstancin, Poland, aged 83.

References

Other websites

1932 births
2015 deaths
Polish ballerinas
Dancers  from Poznań
20th-century Polish ballet dancers